The Optimus Chat is an entry-level, touch-screen smartphone with keyboard manufactured by LG Electronics, Inc. While it is very similar to the LG Optimus One, the main difference is that it includes a smaller touch screen (2.8-inch instead of 3.2-inch) but has a slide-out keyboard instead. It is currently running the Android 2.2 Froyo software stack but may run Android 2.3 Gingerbread.

Carriers
This smartphone is now available on Koodo Mobile.

See also
 Comparison of smartphones
 Galaxy Nexus

References

External links

LG Electronics smartphones
Android (operating system) devices
Discontinued smartphones